Thomas Fale (fl. 1604) was an English mathematician.

Life
Fale matriculated as a sizar of Caius College, Cambridge, in November 1578, removed to Corpus Christi College in 1582, went out B.A. in 1582–3, commenced M.A. in 1586, proceeded B.D. in 1597, and in 1604 had a license from the university to practise medicine.

Publications
His only known publication is Horologiographia (1593). It is dedicated in Latin to all lovers of mathematics in the University of Cambridge. There is also a prefatory letter to 'my loving kinsman,’ Thomas Osborne, who had invented the instrument mentioned in the beginning of the book 'for the triall of plats,’ dated from London, 3 January 1593. The table of sines which it contains is probably the earliest specimen of a trigonometrical table printed in England.

References

 

Year of birth missing
17th-century deaths
Alumni of Gonville and Caius College, Cambridge
Alumni of Corpus Christi College, Cambridge
17th-century English mathematicians
16th-century English writers
16th-century male writers
17th-century English writers
17th-century English male writers
16th-century English mathematicians